The 1st Beijing College Student Film Festival was held in 1993 in Beijing, China. San Mao Joins the Army was the biggest winner, receiving three awards, including Best Film Award, Best Visual Effects Award, and Artistic Exploration Award.

Awards
 Best Film Award: San Mao Joins the Army, Stand Up, Don't Bend Over
 Best Actor Award: Hu Yajie for Old-Mother Soil
 Best Actress Award: Xi Meijuan for Jiang Zhuying
 Best Visual Effects Award: New Dragon Gate Inn, San Mao Joins the Army
 Artistic Exploration Award: San Mao Joins the Army
 Committee Special Award: Jiang Zhuying
 Special Jury Award: Za Zuizi

References

External links

Beijing College Student Film Festival
1993 film festivals
1993 festivals in Asia
Bei